Yudit is a Unicode text editor for the X Window System. It was first released on 1997-11-08. It can do TrueType font rendering, printing, transliterated keyboard input and handwriting recognition with no dependencies on external engines. Yudit's lack of dependence on user interface libraries like QT or GTK+ gives the software its unique look.

Yudit's conversion utilities can convert text between various encodings. Keyboard input maps can also act like text converters. There is no need for a pre-installed multi-lingual environment. Menus are translated into multiple languages.

The developer states that "since the early days of Unicode on Linux", support has improved making future versions of the program unlikely, though documentation may be updated.

The author of Yudit is Gáspár Sinai, a Hungarian programmer, living and working in Japan.

See also
List of text editors
Comparison of text editors

References

External links

Unix text editors
Free text editors
Software using the GPL license
Discontinued software